The fifth season of the German singing competition The Masked Singer premiered on 16 October 2021 on ProSieben. Ruth Moschner and Rea Garvey returned to the panel. Matthias Opdenhövel also returned as host.

On 20 November 2021, the Mülli Müller (singer Alexander Klaws) was declared the winner and the Raupe (singer Sandy Mölling) was the runner-up.

Panelists and host

Matthias Opdenhövel returned as host. On 14 September 2021, it was announced that Ruth Moschner, would be return for her fourth time as the main panelist. On 19 September 2021, it was announced that also Rea Garvey, from the last season would be return, for his third time as main panelist.

As in previous seasons, a spin-off show named The Masked Singer - red. Special was aired after each live episode, hosted by Annemarie Carpendale, who also competed as “Teddy”, (episodes 1–2, 4), Rebecca Mir (episode 3, 5) and Viviane Geppert (episode 6).

Guest panelists
Various guest panelists appeared as the third judge in the judging panel for one episode. These guest panelists included:

Contestants
Like in the previous seasons, the fifth season will include 10 contestants. According to ProSieben, a special eleventh mask, "Tiger" will not compete in the main competition rather they will be an online exclusive mask who will perform separately and be revealed after the finale of season 5.

Episodes

Week 1 (16 October)

Week 2 (23 October)

Week 3 (30 October)

Week 4 (6 November)

Week 5 (13 November) - Semi-final

Week 6 (20 November) – Final
 Group number: "Let's Get Loud" by Jennifer Lopez

Round One

Round Two

Round Three

The Masked Singer Ehrmann Tiger

The Masked Singer Ehrmann Tiger is an online show as part of the fifth season of The Masked Singer. For the first time, a mask appears exclusively online. A performance video is to be put online every Saturday and an evidence video every Tuesday. The unmasking also took place online on 20 November 2021.

Reception

Ratings

Notes

References

External links
 

2021 German television seasons
The Masked Singer (German TV series)